Transport infrastructure in Guinea-Bissau is basic, with most roads outside the capital Bissau being unpaved.

Railways 
There are no railways in Guinea-Bissau. At the Port of Bissau, there was a small cargo railway working from the late 19th century into the 1940s.

In 1998 an agreement was signed between Portugal and Guinea-Bissau for construction of a railway to Guinea, but the outbreak of the Guinea-Bissau Civil War in 1998 made these plans impossible.

Roads 
 Total: 4,400 km
 Paved: 453 km
 Unpaved: 3,947 km (1996 est.)
The Trans–West African Coastal Highway crosses Guinea-Bissau, connecting it to Banjul (the Gambia), Conakry (Guinea), and eventually to 11 other nations of the Economic Community of West African States (ECOWAS).

Waterways 
Several rivers are accessible to coastal shipping in Guinea-Bissau.

Seaports and harbours 
Port of Bissau
Buba
Cacheu
Farim

Merchant Marine 
In 1999 no merchant vessels were operating.

Airports 

The main airport serving the country, and the only one with scheduled commercial service, is Osvaldo Vieira International Airport in Bissau.

 30 (1999 est.)

Paved runways:

 3 (Osvaldo Vieira International Airport, Cufar Airport, and Bubaque Airport)

 Over 3, 047 m:

 1

1,524 to 2,437 m:

 1

914 to 1,523 m:

 1

Unpaved runways:

 27

1,524 to 2,437 m:

1

914 to 1,523 m:

 4

under 914 m:

 22 (1999 est.)

See also 

 Guinea-Bissau
Air Bissau
Guine Bissau Airlines (2002)
Guine Bissau Airlines

References